Étienne (Stephen) Gallant (February 6, 1844 – February 11, 1918) was a merchant and political figure in Prince Edward Island. He represented 3rd Prince in the Legislative Assembly of Prince Edward Island from 1895 to 1897 as a Liberal member.

References

1844 births
1918 deaths
People from Prince County, Prince Edward Island
Prince Edward Island Liberal Party MLAs
Acadian people